Keefe Brasselle (born Henry Keefe Brasselle February 7, 1923 – July 7, 1981) was an American film actor, television actor/producer and author. He is best remembered for the starring role in The Eddie Cantor Story (1953).

Early years and career
Keefe Brasselle broke into motion pictures while serving in the U. S. Navy. His first co-starring role was opposite singing star Gloria Jean in the waterfront mystery River Gang (1945). His dark, chorus-boy looks landed him featured roles in movies through the early 1950s.

He was groomed for stardom in The Eddie Cantor Story, filmed in response to the wildly successful The Jolson Story and Jolson Sings Again starring Larry Parks as Al Jolson, one of Cantor's musical-comedy contemporaries. The Eddie Cantor Story could not equal the success of the Jolson films, largely because Brasselle didn't fit the role physically. Standing almost a foot taller than the real Cantor, and unable to convey Cantor's natural warmth, Brasselle's performance became a caricature: the actor played most of his scenes with bulging eyes and busy hands, which was effective in the musical numbers but awkward in the dramatic scenes. Ultimately, Brasselle's career did not launch as anticipated. In 1954, he was a guest on an episode (season 4, episode 21, Feb. 21, 1954) of The Colgate Comedy Hour with host Gene Wesson, as a promotional tie-in for the film. Brasselle's other career highlights include appearances in the films Never Fear (1949), A Place in the Sun (1951), and Battle Stations (1956).

Nightclubs and television
Brasselle turned to nightclubs, where he appeared as a singer and comedian. In 1961, an Edison Township, New Jersey, nightclub owned by Brasselle burned under suspicious circumstances.  Fire officials came across six empty cans of gasoline at the scene, while their caps and spouts were found separately in a paper bag.

In the summer of 1963, Brasselle starred in a summer replacement series for The Garry Moore Show. Called The Keefe Brasselle Show, the program featured actress Ann B. Davis as herself in three episodes. A 21 year old Barbra Streisand appeared on his first episode on June 25, 1963, in promoting her first album.

Brasselle had a close friendship with CBS executive James Aubrey. Brasselle started his own production company, "Richelieu Productions," and Aubrey granted Brasselle's company three television series without any previous script, pitch or pilots. The insider-chicanery resulted in a lawsuit against Aubrey and Brasselle launched by CBS shareholders. There were rumors that Aubrey had no choice in the matter due to threats from the Mafia, with which Brasselle was known to be connected. During the 1964–1965 season, Brasselle's company produced three new but untested series: The Baileys of Balboa, The Cara Williams Show, and The Reporter, starring Harry Guardino. Those series suffered from poor ratings. Aubrey was removed as president of CBS Television in February 1965 after a long court battle. 

Brasselle later wrote a novel that was a thinly disguised account of his relationship with Aubrey and the network, The CanniBal$ (1968), followed by a sequel, The Barracudas (1973), in which he attacked several showbiz figures he'd worked with, including comedian Jack Benny. Brasselle struggled to find work after his CBS experience and tried to relaunch his fading career, as a self-styled "modern minstrel" recording artist.

Personal life

In 1942, Brasselle married Norma Jean Aldrich; Brasselle was age 19 at the time. The marriage ended in divorce in 1956.

That same year, Brasselle married singer Arlene DeMarco  (January 28, 1933 – February 19, 2013). They divorced in 1967. 

Brasselle was of the Roman Catholic faith and a lifelong Democrat who supported Adlai Stevenson's campaign during the 1952 presidential election.

Later years and death
In 1974, Brasselle signed on as director of the low-budget sex comedy If You Don't Stop It... You'll Go Blind (released 1975; shown in Britain as You Must Be Joking). This was a feature-length parade of burlesque blackouts, double-entendre jokes, and bawdy song-and-dance numbers. Brasselle staged the musical numbers himself and even appeared as a specialty act, embellishing his performance with Eddie Cantor's gestures and mannerisms. The film was booked into hundreds of theaters for midnight shows and, despite scathing reviews from mainstream critics, was very popular with college students; it earned more than four million dollars.

Keefe Brasselle died from liver disease in 1981, at age 58.

Radio appearances

Filmography

References

External links

The Mafia Singer Who Seized Control of CBS Primetime by Kliph Nesteroff

1923 births
1981 deaths
American male film actors
Television producers from Ohio
People from Elyria, Ohio
Male actors from Ohio
Novelists from Ohio
Deaths from liver disease
20th-century American novelists
20th-century American male actors
American male novelists
20th-century American businesspeople
Burials at Holy Cross Cemetery, Culver City
20th-century American male writers
American Roman Catholics
Ohio Democrats
California Democrats